Trigun Stampede is a 2023 anime series based on the manga series of the same name written and illustrated by Yasuhiro Nightow. In June 2022, it was announced the series would be animated by Orange. It premiered in January 2023. It is directed by Kenji Mutō, with Kōji Tajima serving as concept designer and credited with the character concept. Crunchyroll licensed it for a global release. The opening theme is "TOMBI" by Kvi Baba, while the ending theme is "Hoshi no Kuzu α" by Salyu and haruka nakamura.



Episode list

Notes

References

External links
  
 

Trigun
Trigun Stampede